Simon Tigga  was an Indian politician. He was elected to the Lok Sabha, the lower house of the Parliament of India from Khunti, Bihar as a member of the Indian National Congress.

References

External links
Official biographical sketch in Parliament of India website

1929 births
Living people
Indian National Congress politicians
Jharkhand Party politicians
Lok Sabha members from Bihar
India MPs 1984–1989